is a video game series composed primarily of cartoon-themed vertical-scrolling shoot-'em-up games produced by Konami that were released primarily in Japan. The series originated as a coin-operated video game simply titled TwinBee in 1985, which was followed by several home versions and sequels. The character designs of almost every game in the series since Detana!! TwinBee in 1991 were provided by Japanese animator Shuzilow HA (Jujiro Hamakawa), who also planned and supervised most of the subsequent installments in the TwinBee series. The series also inspired a radio drama adaptation that lasted three seasons in Japan, as well as an anime adaptation.

History
The series centers around a blue bee-shaped anthropomorphic spacecraft named TwinBee, who is usually accompanied by a pink "female" counterpart known as WinBee. In most games, the first player controls TwinBee while WinBee is controlled by the second player. A third ship also exists named GwinBee, a green counterpart to TwinBee and WinBee who in most games serves as a power-up, but in some instances also appear as a third playable spacecraft. In contrast to the serious sci-fi theme of Konami's Gradius series, the fictional universe of the TwinBee series is set in a cartoon-like world featuring several kinds of anthropomorphic creatures in addition to regular human characters. The player controls their spacecraft in most games shooting or punching at airborne enemies while throwing bombs at enemies on the ground, similarly to Namco's Xevious. The main power-ups in the TwinBee are yellow bells that the player can uncover by shooting at the floating clouds. The player must shoot these bells to keep them afloat and after shooting them a number of times, they will change colour, allowing the player to add new abilities to their spacecraft.

Despite being one of Konami's most prominent series in Japan during most of the 1990s, only a select few titles were localized for the foreign market. Particularly the second console game Moero! TwinBee (which was released in America under the changed title Stinger); the two SNES installments, Pop'n TwinBee and Pop'n TwinBee: Rainbow Bell Adventures, in Europe and TwinBee Da!! for Game Boy, which was released in Europe as a standalone title with the name Pop'n TwinBee and later in compilations. The second arcade game, Detana!! TwinBee, also had a limited international release under the name of Bells & Whistles. The original arcade game was featured in the Nintendo DS compilation Konami Classics Series: Arcade Hits under the name RainbowBell (the European compilation, however, uses the original TwinBee name).

List of games

TwinBee, released March 5, 1985: An original arcade vertical shooter, TwinBee plays similar to Namco's Xevious. Players use TwinBee or WinBee in a short string of six levels that repeats indefinitely, with a boss at the end of each. A Family Computer (Famicom)  and an MSX version were made in 1986. The Famicom version was re-released for the Game Boy Advance under Nintendo's Famicom Mini label in Japan only. It was released in North America as part of an arcade compilation for Nintendo DS in March, 2007, where it was renamed RainbowBell; when the compilation was released in Europe, the TwinBee name was restored.
TwinBee Deluxe, Released February 25, 2004: The Mobile Version just like a WinBee in a Deluxe Game.
Mini Famicom: TwinBee, Released May 21, 2004: The Famicom Version was re-released for Game Boy Advance is part for Mini Famicom.
3D Classics: TwinBee, Released August 10, 2011: The game was also redone in 3D and released on the Nintendo eShop under Nintendo's 3D Classics line.
Moero TwinBee: Cinnamon-hakase o Sukue!, released on November 21, 1986, and in 1987 in America as Stinger, this is the first game in the TwinBee series that was released in North America. Some enemy force kidnaps Dr. Cinnamon (creator of the TwinBee ships) and TwinBee, WinBee and GwinBee must rescue him. The Japanese version for the Family Computer Disk System in 1986, this game allowed up to three players simultaneously. Unlike its predecessor, Stinger has horizontal shooter levels (like Gradius) in addition to the vertical ones. Since the Disk System extension was not released in North America, the American version was released as a cartridge; however, it lost the three-player mode (only allowing for up to two players), the story scenes were removed and the difficulty was altered. Moero! TwinBee was re-released in cartridge format in 1993 with a new easy mode added.TwinBee 3: Poko Poko Daimaō, released on September 29, 1989. This is the last game in the TwinBee series for the Famicom to be released and the third game in the series. It ditches Stinger's horizontal levels, which makes this more in line with the first title.Pop'n TwinBee, first released on October 12, 1990, in Japan and in autumn 1994 in Europe, is a sequel for the Game Boy to the original TwinBee. In Japan, it is known as TwinBee Da!!. Despite the European title, the Japanese version actually predates the release of the Super Famicom version of Pop'n TwinBee by three years. A colorized version of the game is featured in Konami GB Collection Vol. 2 in Japan and Konami GB Collection Vol. 3 in Europe. A full remake is featured in TwinBee Portable for PlayStation Portable.Detana!! TwinBee (also known as Bells & Whistles outside Japan), first released on February 21, 1991: An arcade release, also ported to the PC Engine (which was ported to Virtual Console), Sharp X68000, PlayStation and Sega Saturn (the latter two bundled with TwinBee Yahho!). It has no relation to the original and Famicom games. While not too different from its predecessors, gameplay-wise, Detana! improves vastly on graphics and audio. It also introduces the current character cast, like TwinBee's and WinBee's characters (Light and Pastel, respectively) and other characters that would remain in the subsequent games. It was the most popular game in the series in Japan and paved the way for some merchandise products (including audio dramas and an Original Video Animation). This also introduced cutscenes that played between stages, which usually showed Pastel and WinBee getting one up on Light and TwinBee.Pop'n TwinBee, first released on March 26, 1993, and later 1993 in Europe: A SNES game. It is one of Detana!s sequels, though they play differently. Pop uses a large energy bar, which results in game over if it depletes. When playing with two players, it is also possible to share energy.Pop'n TwinBee: Rainbow Bell Adventures (TwinBee: Rainbow Bell Adventure in Japan), released on January 7, 1994, in Japan and also in Europe during the same year. This SNES game meant the first real departure in the series. Rainbow Bell Adventures is a side-scrolling platformer. Also released in Europe, though the level order, some dialogue and the back-up system (the European version uses passwords, the Japanese one uses battery) are different.
TwinBee Taisen Puzzle-Dama published on December 9, 1994, in Japan. It is a puzzle video game for PlayStation; simple mechanics are part of a series of puzzles Taisen Puzzle-Dama and that this issue takes as its theme the world TwinBee. The game was also planned to be released on the Sega Saturn in 1995 before getting cancelled.
TwinBee Yahho!, released on April 19, 1995: Another sequel for Detana!, originally released in arcades, and later ported to the PlayStation and Saturn (along with Detana! TwinBee). Included a vocal theme song, among other vocals, with WinBee greeting the arcade owner each time it is booted, and various snatches of dialogue from most of the characters, all voiced by the cast of TwinBee Paradise.
Detana TwinBee Yahho! Deluxe Pack, a compilation released on September 29, 1995, in Japan for the PlayStation and subsequently ported to the Sega Saturn. It contains Detana!! TwinBee and TwinBee Yahho!.
 , released on February 26, 1998: More than a game, this is a CD-ROM with accessories inspired by the series (as a screensaver, etc.) for Windows 95.
TwinBee RPG, released on April 3, 1998: Featuring 3D graphics and made for the PlayStation, this simplistic role playing game, set in the complete universe of the series, was the last stand-alone retail release in the series.
, released on 2002: A rock-paper-scissors video game for mobile phones.
, released on May 6, 2003: A mobile title that is part of 
TwinBee Dungeon, released on May 14, 2004: A roguelike dungeon RPG for cell phones themed on TwinBee universe which is part of the Mystery Dungeon series.
TwinBee Portable, released on January 25, 2007 (Japan): A PSP compilation featuring TwinBee, Detana!! TwinBee, Pop'n TwinBee, TwinBee Yahho!, and a remake of the Game Boy game TwinBee Da!.
TwinBee JG Pachisuro, released in September, 2007 (Japan): A TwinBee themed pachislot machine released by KPE. The machine is based on TwinBee Yahho! world.
Line GoGo! TwinBee, released on May 20, 2013, is a classic TwinBee shooter for iOS and Android developed by NAVER JAPAN and distributed by LINE GAME (LINE Corporation).

Cancelled games
TwinBee Miracle (PlayStation), 1996.

Related media

Radio drama
A radio drama version of the series was produced following the release of Pop'n TwinBee for the Super Famicom titled , which began airing on the radio station NCB on October 10, 1993. The series lasted three seasons, with the third and final series concluding on March 30, 1997, comprising a total of 96 episodes, which were later released in drama CD collections.

TwinBee Paradise features the same cast of characters previously introduced in Detana!! TwinBee and Pop'n TwinBee. TwinBee Paradise further developed the fictional universe of the TwinBee and many story elements introduced in the serials, including the names of TwinBee's and WinBee's pilots, Light and Pastel (who were originally nameless characters in the games), who were canonized in later video games such as TwinBee Yahho! and TwinBee RPG.

Anime
Two short anime films and an OVA mini-series based on the TwinBee were produced:

Sometimes shortened to Winbee's  Panic.
 The second anime short, was released in 1998 alongside the first short in a promotional tie-in to the subsequent OVA series. Alternatively titled Tulip Beach Stories.

The OVA series is titled TwinBee Paradise and is based on the radio drama of the same name. The OVA comprises three episodes, which were released individually on VHS and Laserdisc in 1999:

 "Venus' Smile" ( "")
 "Midsummer Mirage" (（）"")
 "Evil Revival" ( "")

Manga
 Four 1993 Comic Gamest supplements (volumes 85, 89, 93, and 97) contained manga of Detana! TwinBee drawn and written by Mine Yoshizaki. Between 1994 and 1996, an official manga, also by Yoshizaki, was published in three volumes in the collection Gamest Comics (numbers 011, 039 and 076).
 In 2004, a manga was released titled Paradisiac Days and DECADE -TwinBee PARADISE TRIBUTE-.
 In 2005, a manga was released titled Tempora mutantur, et nos mutamur in illis.
 In 2006, a manga was released titled The first day of summer and DON'T SQUEEZE!.

Other manga 
 TwinBee and Moero! TwinBee, were both featured in the manga titled Famicom Rocky, published by Comic Coro Coro from 1985 to 1987.
 TwinBee, was featured in the manga Famicom Ryu (1985-1987) and Nekketsu! Famicom Shounendan (1986-1987), published by Comic Coro Coro.
 In Issue 4, Episode 46, TwinBee 3: Poko Poko Daimaō was adapted for the manga  from 1988 to 1990.
 Moero! TwinBee: Cinnamon Hakushi wo Sukue!, the second game in the series, was adapted for the manga titled , published in the Famitsu Comics collection from March 1989 and drawn by Tamakichi Sakura.
 TwinBee is one of the video games featured in the manga titled Rock'n Game Boy, by Shigeto Ikehara and Published by Comic BomBom from October 1989 to December 1991.

Appearances in other games
The Goonies (Famicom video game) lets you collect TwinBee as an item for 5,000 points.
Gradius: The MSX version has a secret Twinbee cameo.
Tokimeki Memorial features a shoot-'em-up mini game starring TwinBee.
Tokimeki Memorial 2: A young man crossplays as Princess Melora.
Battle Tryst: Pastel is an unlockable playable character in this fighting game.
Konami Wai Wai World: TwinBee is one of two playable ships (Vic Viper being the other one) in the second to last stage, which is a generic vertical shooting stage.
Wai Wai World 2: SOS!! Parsley Jō: TwinBee is a playable character in certain levels. However, the levels in which he is playable are not just vertical shooting stages, but on-rails shooting stages in the vein of Space Harrier, as well.
Hexion has sound clips from Detana!! Twinbee.
Parodius series: In most of the series, TwinBee and WinBee made an appearance as playable characters, while Shooting Star (the enemy red ship in TwinBee Yahho!) is playable in Sexy Parodius. Also, while Parodius is more of a parody of Gradius, it features the bell powerup system in addition to the Gradius's bar system as well. Both systems works in parallel and give different powerups. Also, the bell system's powerups are temporary, while the bar system not.
Ganbare Goemon 2: Kiteretsu Shōgun Magginesu: Pastel makes an appearance as an NPC in a house at the village which is visited at night.
 Snatcher: In the PlayStation and Sega Saturn versions, Light and Pastel appear as clients at the Outer Heaven nightclub among other Konami characters.
Konami Krazy Racers: Pastel is a playable character in this kart-racing game with Konami characters. Since Pastel is available from the beginning this game represents her first time as a primary-tier character. It is the second game released in United States with a TwinBee character. Also, different colored bells in this game have different powerups.
Airforce Delta has Twinbee as a secret usable aircraft.
DreamMix TV World Fighters: TwinBee is a playable character in this fighting game.
Castlevania series: TwinBee makes an appearance as a secret item in Castlevania: Portrait of Ruin, Castlevania: Order of Ecclesia and Castlevania: Harmony of Despair.
Otomedius: Twinbee characters appear in both Otomedius and Otomedius Excellent
Quiz Magic Academy 5: Getting the correct answer shows a bunch of bells and Twinbees flying.
Bishi Bashi: One of the games in the series has Light and Pastel as playable characters.
New LovePlus+ features a shoot-'em-up mini game starring TwinBee and WinBee.
Kingdom Dragonion: TwinBee was a player character in this game.
VS! Bomberman: TwinBee Characters, Light and Pastel was Costumes by Bomberman.
 Various entries in rhythm game franchises including Dance Dance Revolution, Beatmania IIDX, Pop'n Music, BeatStream, and  features remixes of songs from games in the Twinbee series..
Konami Characore World
Tokimeki Idol
Pixel Puzzle Collection
Bombergirl: Pastel appears as playable.
Super Bomberman R: One of the Dastardly Bombers eventually morphs into a Gwinbee boss.
Contra: Returns: TwinBee and WinBee appears as a Pet Spotlight.

References

External links
 Hardcore Gaming 101 - Twinbee
 English Section of Shuzilow HA website
 

1998 anime OVAs
OVAs based on video games
Japanese radio dramas
Konami franchises
TwinBee
Video game franchises
Video game franchises introduced in 1985
Video games developed in Japan

ja:ツインビー